Alice Lau is a Malaysian politician.

Alice Lau may also refer to:

Alice Lau (actress), Hong Kong stage performing artist; see I Have a Date with Spring
Alice Lau (civil servant), former Commissioner of Inland Revenue of Hong Kong; see Hong Kong order of precedence